Brottensburgh is a ghost town in Mad River Township of Clark County, in the U.S. state of Ohio. It was located less than one mile from Enon, but the precise location is unknown to the GNIS.

History
Brottensburgh developed around a gristmill built in 1818 on the Mad River.

References

Geography of Clark County, Ohio
Ghost towns in Ohio
1818 establishments in Ohio
Populated places established in 1818